Northbound is the first greatest hits collection by Australian pub rock band Cold Chisel, released in Germany in 1983.
It included tracks from their first three studio albums, Cold Chisel, Breakfast at Sweethearts and East.

The included mix of "Dresden" features a slightly different vocal to the familiar Breakfast at Sweethearts mix.

Track listing
 A1	"Cheap Wine" - 3:21
 A2	"Choirgirl" - 3:12
 A3	"Khe Sanh" - 4:08
 A4	"Shipping Steel" - 3:22
 A5	"Breakfast at Sweethearts" - 4:06
 A6	"Home and Broken Hearted" - 3:23
 B1	"My Baby" - 3:57
 B2	"Star Hotel" - 4:03
 B3	"Northbound" - 3:12
 B4	"Standing on the Outside" - 2:49
 B5	"Dresden" - 3:52
 B6	"Party's Over" - 2:58

References

1983 compilation albums
Compilation albums by Australian artists
Cold Chisel albums